Morad Mohammad Bazar (also Romanized as Morād Moḩammad Bāzār; also known as Seh Rāhī Talang) is a village in Pir Sohrab Rural District, in the Central District of Chabahar County, Sistan and Baluchestan Province, Iran. At the 2006 census, its population was 351, in 84 families.

References 

Populated places in Chabahar County